Tommi Kari (born 22 September 1986) is a Finnish footballer who plays as a midfielder for Kakkonen club PPJ.

References

External links
 Tommi Kari at JJK
 Tommi Kari at Guardian Football

1986 births
Living people
People from Kouvola
Finnish footballers
Association football midfielders
FC Lahti players
JJK Jyväskylä players
Veikkausliiga players
Kakkonen players
Sportspeople from Kymenlaakso